Bhawania goodei is a species of polychaete worms in the family Chrysopetalidae. It is found in tropical waters around the world. It was described from Bermuda.

References

External links 

 
 Bhawania goodei at the World Register of Marine Species (WoRMS)

Phyllodocida
Animals described in 1884
Fauna of Bermuda